W. gigantea may refer to:
 Werauhia gigantea, a plant species native to Venezuela
 Wittrockia gigantea, a plant species endemic to Brazil

Synonyms
 Wellingtonia gigantea, a synonym for Sequoiadendron giganteum, a massive tree species

See also
 Gigantea (disambiguation)